Rock Creek is in the Boundary Country region of south central British Columbia. The unincorporated settlement is mostly on the southwest side of the Kettle River at the confluence with Rock Creek.

Gold rush
In 1859, gold discovered along the creek (after which the community is named) triggered the placer mining of the Rock Creek Gold Rush. By the following year, many substantial log buildings housed stores and saloons that created the earliest community in the Boundary. However, the prospectors' tents were strung out along the creek beyond what is now Rock Creek Canyon Bridge ( west), the most dramatic span on the Crowsnest Highway. To collect taxes on imports and royalties on exported gold, William George Cox was appointed gold commissioner and customs agent, and instructed to proceed to Rock Creek. In the interim, John Carmichael Haynes, his deputy, arrived in October 1860 to establish the first customs post outside the colonial capital of New Westminster.

Gold bust
In concert, a reliable road from the coast was needed. At the time, the Dewdney Trail reached as far the Similkameen Valley. In January 1861, Dewdney and Moberly won the £300/mile contract to extend their pack trail to Rock Creek. By the time they entered their destination that August, the boom was over, the prospectors gone, and most of the 23 permanent buildings abandoned. In March 1862, Cox was re-assigned to the Cariboo district and Haynes proceeded to close down the offices.

In 1886 and 1900, high-pressure hoses were used for a few years to dislodge gold, but neither attempt proved profitable. Only four lots sold of a government townsite surveyed to the east in 1898. The Madge family operated a hotel from 1898.

Railway era
The westward construction of the Vancouver, Victoria and Eastern Railway (VV& E), which followed Myers Creek a couple of miles south during 1905, offered no benefit to the settlement. In 1911, the westward advance of the Kettle Valley Railway passed on the northeast side of the river. The final passenger train ran in 1964. The line westward closed to all traffic in 1973, and eastward in 1979.

Lode mining & quarrying
Immediately adjacent to the lower few kilometres of Highway 33 were the Riverside and Imperial Mines, where claims began in the late 1890s. The latter were last worked for their gold and silver ores in 1926. During the 1970s much of the area was prospected for Uranium with no apparent success. A joint venture between Rock Creek Resources and Silver Falls Resources surveyed these sites in 1988, noting the presence of greenstone and copper.

Since 1972, several operators have quarried dolomite for crushing into sparkling white gravel for agricultural, landscaping and decorative purposes.

Commerce
Businesses comprise a café, two gas stations, a hotel, a motel, two souvenir shops and a campground. The hotel vies with the Leland Hotel in Nakusp for the title of the oldest operating hostelry in BC. The small settlement remains important as a regional service centre for the farming and mining communities of the Boundary Country and the Monashee Country, which lies northward. It is the effective base town for Mount Baldy Ski Area, which lies to its northwest and overlooks the Okanagan Valley town of Oliver.

Riverside
Riverside existed a mile away, but it is unclear when that community maintained a separate identity. By 1960, nearly all the buildings were gone.

Television
Rock Creek was featured on the historical television documentary series Gold Trails and Ghost Towns, Season 3, Episode 8.

See also
Anarchist Mountain
Beaverdell
Greenwood, British Columbia
Midway, British Columbia
Camp McKinney, British Columbia
Johnstone Creek Provincial Park

References

Designated places in British Columbia
Unincorporated settlements in British Columbia
Populated places in the Boundary Country
British Columbia gold rushes
Mining communities in British Columbia